Brygada Kryzys is the debut studio album by Polish band Brygada Kryzys. It was released in 1982, through the record label Tonpress.

Track listing

Personnel 
 Tomasz Lipiński – vocal, guitar
 Robert Brylewski – guitar
 Ireneusz Wereński – bass guitar
 Janusz Rołt – drums
 Jarosław Ptasiński – drums
 Tomasz Świtalski – saxophone

External links 
 Brygada Kryzys – Brygada Kryzys (LP Tonpress 1982) Discogs

1982 debut albums
Brygada Kryzys albums